Bai Yulu is a snooker player, World junior champion from China.

Early life 
Bai was born in Dongguan, Guangdong Province, China in 2003.

Career

Hong Kong World Women Snooker Masters
While Bai Yulu was round about 16 year-old in 2019, she was restricted from travelling to participate in all the snooker competitions around the world. When Bai Yulu traveled to Hong Kong for 2019 Hong Kong World Women Snooker Masters, she was accompanied by her mother.

Bai played well in the 2019 Hong Kong World Women Masters, giving first place to Rebecca Kenna and finished second.

World Women Snooker
She was 2019 reigning World junior champion, as well as took part in 2019 World Women Snooker (WWS).

Snooker Championship for Juniors

When 2019 International Billiards and Snooker Federation (IBSF) Snooker Championship  for juniors (men Under-18 and women and men Under-21) was held in the Olympic Center of Pingdu, Qingdao, Shandong Province during 4—13 of July, Bai Yulu won in final in the women's group, and she also celebrated her 16th birthday during the competitions. There Bai Yulu won 6–1 against Nutcharut Wongharuthai, Thailand (who was last year champion), in final.

She reached the quarter-finals of the 2019 IBSF Women's World Snooker Championship and also made the three highest  of the tournament: 91, 81 and 78.

References

External links
 2019 Hong Kong World Women Masters Final Bai Yulu vs Rebecca Kenna, YouTube video 

Living people
2003 births
Chinese snooker players
Female snooker players
People from Dongguan
21st-century Chinese people